Intraocular lens scaffold or IOL scaffold technique is a surgical procedure in ophthalmology. In cases where the posterior lens capsule is ruptured and the cataract has not yet been removed one can insert the intraocular lens (IOL) inside the eye under the cataract. This way the IOL acts as a scaffold and prevents the cataract pieces from falling inside the back of the eye. The cataract can then be removed safely by emulsifying it with ultrasound and aspiration. This technique is called IOL scaffold and was started by Amar Agarwal from Chennai, India, at Dr. Agarwal's Eye Hospital.

The technique can also be used to support and protect the posterior capsule membrane during a lens swap procedure.

Definition 

The lens capsule in which the new artificial lens is to be inserted may be damaged due to trauma, from birth or by surgery. During cataract surgery, when half or more of the lens is remaining and the operating surgeon notices capsule damage; the IOL scaffold technique 6 can be used to rescue the lens and prevent further complications. In this technique, the selected artificial lens or IOL is placed in the sulcus ( remaining part of the lens bag) and phacoemulsification surgery using ultrasound is performed over it (Fig 1). Once the entire lens is removed on the surface of the IOL, the IOL is well positioned on the capsule remnant (sulcus). As soon as the surgeon notices the capsular tear or sinking nucleus, anterior chamber infusion can be used to stabilize the chamber. Anterior vitrectomy is performed to remove the vitreous in the pupil and anterior part of eye. Then the IOL which is already planned for placing in the lens bag is inserted under the nucleus on the remaining capsule bag. The nucleus is positioned on the IOL and the remaining surgery is completed.

Advantage 
By this method, the risk of lens fragments falling into the vitreous or back part of the eye is reduced. The IOL acts as a barrier or scaffold preventing the lens remnants from falling back. Since there is also separation of the posterior part of the eye (vitreous) from the anterior part (aqueous), there is less risk of retinal problems.  Moreover, there is no need for special instruments or additional training required once this method is learnt.

History 
Intraocular lens scaffold technique was introduced by Dr Amar Agarwal in 2012. He used this technique in a case which had posterior capsular rupture during a phacoemulsification procedure.

Indications 
The technique can be use for intraoperative nucleus removal during cataract surgery (phacoemulsification), removal of lens dropped on the retina, Sommering ring removal, Intraocular foreign body removal, and IOL explantation.

Glued IOL scaffold 

In an eye with total loss of bag where there is no capsular bag remnant, glued IOL scaffold is used. In this first a glued IOL is done behind the cataract pieces.  The glued IOL then works as a scaffold and the cataract pieces are removed with the phaco handpiece using ultrasound. Here two partial thickness scleral flaps measuring 2.5 to 2.5 mm are made 180 degrees diagonally apart. Infusion is placed by anterior chamber maintainer and sclerotomies are made below the flaps with 20 gauge needle. The desired IOL is injected below the remaining lens particles in the eye and the remaining lens are positioned on the artificial lens or IOL(Fig 2). The haptics of the IOL are brought out under the flaps as in the glued IOL method and tucked into the scleral tunnel made with 26 gauge needle at the entry site. The phacoemulsification procedure is then continued on the IOL and the anterior chamber is formed by the end of the procedure. Scleral flaps and conjunctiva are then closed with fibrin glue.
In IOL scaffold the IOL is placed above the iris (diaphragm of the eye) or above some remnant of the capsule whereas in glued IOL scaffold as there is not enough iris or capsule support a glued IOL is done which then acts as a scaffold.

Glued IOL scaffold for Sommering ring 

Soemmering ring is the ring shaped growth of lens cells after surgical removal of cataractous lens in childhood. This is seen as peripheral ring after pupil dilatation. Patients who undergo artificial lens implantation in an eye that had cataract surgery in childhood, will need this technique to remove the ring remnant. Here the IOL is placed in glued IOL scaffold method and the Sommering ring is dislodged on the IOL and is removed (Fig 3).

IOL scaffold for refractive surprise 
Refractive surprise can happen in eyes after IOL implantation; wrong lens or wrong power can be the probable cause for this. In that situation, the existing IOL is removed and another IOL of correct power is placed. IOL scaffold is being used for this condition also; where the new IOL is placed into the lens bag below the old IOL. The new IOL placed acts as scaffold or barrier and helps as a platform for the removal of the old lens.

IOL scaffold for foreign body removal 

External foreign bodies can enter the eye and can get lodged on the retina or vitreous. This is often removed through the open method of opening through the sclera (white coat of the eye). While removing large intraocular foreign bodies (IOFB), it may drop or slip onto the back part of eye again. In order to prevent this, the IOL can be placed on the sulcus or glued to the sclera and the IOFB can be removed over it (Fig 4). This will prevent the accidental slippage of IOFB into the eye.

Outcomes 
There has been no increased risk of postoperative complications like endothelial decompensation or post operative uveitis. Good visual outcome are obtained in all the patients after IOL scaffold procedure. IOL has been noted to be stable without decentering in all the eyes.

References 

Tissue transplants
Eye surgery